Monumental is a collaborative studio album by American rapper and record producer Pete Rock and hip hop duo Smif-N-Wessun. It was released on June 28, 2011 through Duck Down Music. Recording sessions took place at DaMan Studios in New York. Production was handled entirely by Pete Rock, who also served as executive producer together with Steele and Tek. It features guest appearances from Black Rob, Buckshot, Bun B, Freeway, Heltah Skeltah, Hurricane G, Jahdan Blakkamoore, Memphis Bleek, Raekwon, Styles P, Top Dog and Tyler Woods. The album peaked at number 110 on the Billboard 200 and number 24 on the Top R&B/Hip-Hop Albums.

Critical reception

Monumental was met with generally favorable reviews. At Album of the Year, which assigns a normalized rating out of 100 to reviews from mainstream publications, the album received an average score of 74, based on four reviews.

Cover photography made by Daruis Vick was featured on Pitchfork's 'The Worst Album Covers of 2011' list among 19 other cover arts.

Track listing

Personnel
Peter "Pete Rock" Phillips – producer, mixing, executive producer
"Dan The Man" Humiston – mixing
Michael Sarsfield – mastering
C/4 – engineering
Killa Ben – engineering
M Nasty – engineering
Rob "Giambi" Garcia – engineering
Darrell "Steele" Yates, Jr. – executive producer
Tekomin "Tek" Williams – executive producer
Kenyatta "Buckshot" Blake – associate executive producer
Drew "Dru-Ha" Friedman – associate executive producer
Darius Vick – photography (front cover)
Skrilla – additional artwork

Charts

References

External links

2011 albums
Pete Rock albums
Smif-n-Wessun albums
Duck Down Music albums
Albums produced by Pete Rock